Loughton St John's is an electoral ward in Epping Forest, UK and is one of seven wards that represent Loughton, Essex.

Demographics

Wards of Epping Forest District
Loughton